Kimmo Kapanen (born September 12, 1974) is a retired Finnish professional ice hockey goaltender.

Kapanen played for several Finnish teams during his career including Ässät, HPK and KalPa. Kapanen also played in Sweden for Timrå IK and in Germany for Iserlohn Roosters.

Playing career 
Kapanen started his career in 1992 playing for KalPa in SM-liiga. He played in Finland until 2001 when he moved to Timrå IK in the Swedish elite league Elitserien. He stayed with Timrå for three seasons and had his best season in 2003-04 when he was recorded for eight shutouts and 2.21 GAA.

From 2005 he returned to KalPa and played with them for two seasons. He only played 69 matches there due to several injuries.

On January 22, 2007, Kapanen was loaned to HV71 in Elitserien for the remainder of the season 2006-07. With only three games played for his new club, he injured his foot during a training session in the beginning of March, and was out for the entire 2006-07 playoffs.

After his loan, Kapanen was contracted to Ässät and played the 2007-08 season in Pori.

In 2008, Kapanen announced his retirement from playing due to injuries. He began working with SM Liiga Club KalPa until 2017. Following his resignation from Kalpa, he joined Acme World Sports as a player agent in May 2017.

Personal life
Kapanen is the younger brother of Sami Kapanen who retired from the NHL in 2008. His son Oliver plays in Finland for KalPa. His father Hannu Kapanen, uncle  and nephews Kasperi Kapanen and  also all played hockey at a high level.

References

Web sites

External links 
 

1974 births
Living people
Sportspeople from Vantaa
Finnish ice hockey goaltenders
Espoo Blues players
HIFK (ice hockey) players
HPK players
HV71 players
Iserlohn Roosters players
KalPa players
Timrå IK players
Ässät players
Finnish expatriate ice hockey players in Germany